These are the late night schedules for the four United States broadcast networks that offer programming during this time period, starting September 2018. All times are Eastern or Pacific. Affiliates will fill non-network schedule with local, syndicated, or paid programming. Affiliates also have the option to preempt or delay network programming at their discretion.

Schedule 
 New series are highlighted in bold.
 All times correspond to U.S. Eastern and Pacific Time scheduling (except for some live sports or events). Except where affiliates slot certain programs outside their network-dictated timeslots, subtract one hour for Central, Mountain, Alaska, and Hawaii-Aleutian times.
 Local schedules may differ, as affiliates have the option to pre-empt or delay network programs, and fill timeslots not allocated to network programs with local, syndicated, or paid programming at their discretion. Such scheduling may be limited to preemptions caused by local or national breaking news or weather coverage (which may force stations to tape delay certain programs in overnight timeslots or defer them to a co-operated station or a digital subchannel in their regular timeslot) and any overrunning major sports events scheduled to air in a weekday timeslot (mainly during major holidays). Stations may air shows at other times at their preference.
 All sporting events air live in all time zones in correspondence to U.S. Eastern Time scheduling; in situations in which a scheduled sporting event overruns into the late night time period (as with telecasts of NBC Sunday Night Football during Fall, ABC’s Saturday Night Football during Fall and NBA Saturday Primetime during Spring, and Fox’s Thursday Night Football during Fall, all of which typically ran into the 11:00 p.m. ET hour), local late-night programming will start or be joined in progress on owned and affiliated stations (particularly in the Mountain, Central and Eastern Time Zones) after the game’s completion.

Sunday–Friday overnights

Notes:
 Early morning newscasts air Sunday–Thursday overnights; late night talk shows air Monday–Friday overnights.
 ABC, CBS and NBC affiliates offer their rebroadcasts of the network evening newscasts to accommodate local scheduling in selecting markets that do not offer encores of the local late news; some stations with encores of local late news will air alongside the network evening news rebroadcasts leading in to the networks' overnight newscasts, or with syndicated and time-lease programs.
 ABC, NBC and CBS offer their early morning newscasts via a looping feed (usually running as late as 10:00 a.m. Pacific Time) to accommodate local scheduling in the westernmost contiguous time zones or for use a filler programming for stations that do not offer a local morning newscast; some stations without a morning newscast may air syndicated or time-lease programs instead of the full newscast loop.
 In April 2019, Today with Kathie Lee and Hoda was renamed Today with Hoda and Jenna due to the departure of longtime co-host Kathie Lee Gifford and her subsequent replacement by Jenna Bush Hager. On April 8, 2019, NBC owned-and-operated stations began repurposing the 2:07 a.m. ET slot for local news rebroadcasts and syndicated programs; the network continues to offer a rebroadcast of the fourth hour of Today in that time slot, which is carried at the afilliate's discretion.
 Last Call with Carson Daly aired its last episode on May 24, 2019, with reruns continuing to air on NBC until September 13, 2019.

Saturday overnights

Notes:
 NBC also provides a 90-minute block of LXTV-produced programs (Open House, Open House NYC and 1st Look) on Saturday overnights, following Saturday Night Live; scheduling varies by affiliate.
The Fox lineup began at 11:30 p.m. Eastern/10:30 p.m. Central on weeks when the Fox College Football carries primetime games through fall and early winter. Mountain and Pacific Time Zone start times will remain as shown on said weeks.

By network

ABC

Returning series
ABC World News Now
Jimmy Kimmel Live!
Nightline

CBS

Returning series
CBS Overnight News
The Late Show with Stephen Colbert
The Late Late Show with James Corden

Fox

Returning series
Hell's Kitchen 
Gordon Ramsay's 24 Hours to Hell and Back 
MasterChef Junior 

Not Returning from 2017-18
Encore Programming

NBC

Returning series
Last Call with Carson Daly
Late Night with Seth Meyers
Saturday Night Live
Today With Kathie Lee and Hoda 
The Tonight Show Starring Jimmy Fallon

References

United States late night network television schedules
Late
Late